Scappi is an Italian surname. Notable people with the surname include:

Bartolomeo Scappi ( 1500–1577), Italian chef and writer
Caterina Scappi (died 1643), Italian born Maltese benefactress
Federico Scappi (born 1994), Italian footballer

Italian-language surnames